Yemassee is a small Lowcountry town in Beaufort and Hampton counties in the U.S. state of South Carolina. The population was 1,027 at the 2010 census. Yemassee is near the borders of Colleton and Jasper counties. The town is divided by the county line between Beaufort and Hampton counties, which follows the roadbed of the CSX railroad. Most of the town's population presently lies within Hampton County (as of 2019). As defined by the U.S. Census Bureau, the Beaufort County portion of Yemassee is included within the Hilton Head Island-Bluffton-Beaufort, SC Metropolitan Statistical Area. Yemassee hosts one of the few commercial breeding facilities of non-human primates in the entire United States, Alpha Genesis, Inc., which serves as a major employer for the town. Also, the Frank Lloyd Wright-designed Auldbrass Plantation house and outbuildings lie just outside the town limits of Yemassee.

History
The town takes its name from the Native American tribe of the same name, the Yamasee, which was the most important Indian ally of South Carolina until the Yamasee War of 1715. The first attack that began the Yamasee War occurred in the Yamasee town of Pocotaligo, today part of the town of Yemassee.

The site of the present town is surrounded by both Revolutionary and Civil War sites. The remains of Civil War field fortifications can be observed along U.S. 21 and 17A between Yemassee and Pocotaligo (that section of highway is now a part of Yemassee, as the town has now greatly expanded into Beaufort County [as of 2006]). As of 2006 there is a building boom underway in and around Yemassee. The rural aspect of Yemassee is now (as of 2006) beginning to disappear with the construction of large numbers of new homes and very large housing developments in the area.

William Gilmore Simms published the novel The Yemassee: A Romance of Carolina in the 19th century, and the University of South Carolina in Columbia publishes a literary journal titled Yemassee.
 
The Yemassee Train Depot was the final stop for Marine Corps Recruits to Parris Island for much of the 19th and 20th centuries.

Geography
Yemassee is located at  (32.694771, -80.853091).

Demographics

2020 census

As of the 2020 United States census, there were 1,080 people, 390 households, and 230 families residing in the town.

2000 census
As of the census of 2000, there were 807 people, 323 households, and 208 families residing in the town. The population density was 179.7 people per square mile (69.4/km2). There were 378 housing units at an average density of 84.2 per square mile (32.5/km2). The racial makeup of the town was 55.39% African American, 43.25% White, 0.62% Asian, and 0.74% from two or more races. Hispanic or Latino of any race were 0.87% of the population.

There were 323 households, out of which 34.1% had children under the age of 18 living with them, 35.3% were married couples living together, 24.8% had a female householder with no husband present, and 35.3% were non-families. 31.6% of all households were made up of individuals, and 17.3% had someone living alone who was 65 years of age or older. The average household size was 2.46 and the average family size was 3.12.

In the town, the population was spread out, with 31.0% under the age of 18, 8.2% from 18 to 24, 26.0% from 25 to 44, 17.3% from 45 to 64, and 17.5% who were 65 years of age or older. The median age was 33 years. For every 100 females, there were 80.5 males. For every 100 females age 18 and over, there were 73.0 males.

The median income for a household in the town was $24,868, and the median income for a family was $31,429. Males had a median income of $31,944 versus $19,375 for females. The per capita income for the town was $14,186. About 22.2% of families and 22.9% of the population were below the poverty line, including 24.7% of those under age 18 and 20.3% of those age 65 or over.

Transportation
Yemassee is accessible from three exits along Interstate 95 (exits 33, 38 and 42), which runs to the west of the town limits. Alternate U.S. Highway 17 and U.S. Highway 21 run through the town. S.C. Highway 68 connects Yemassee with other communities in Hampton County, including Varnville and Hampton. The town is also home to an Amtrak station, which serves as the principal rail access point for the Lowcountry region.

Notable people
 Chief Bey, African drummer
 Frank Blair, NBC television journalist

References

External links
Town of Yemassee official website

Towns in South Carolina
Towns in Beaufort County, South Carolina
Towns in Hampton County, South Carolina
Hilton Head Island–Beaufort micropolitan area